Sak Muwaan was a king of the Maya city Motul de San José in Guatemala. He ruled sometime between 700–726.

An Ik-style vessel possesses a hieroglyphic text declaring that it was the property of Chuy-ti Chan, the son of Sak Muwaan. Chuy-ti Chan is described as an artist and ballplayer.

His successor was Yajaw Te' K'inich.

References

Kings of Motul de San José
8th century in Guatemala